Gerhard I, Count of Holstein-Itzehoe (1232 – 21 December 1290) was the only count of Holstein-Itzehoe.

Life 
He was the second son of Count Adolf IV of Holstein and Heilwig of Lippe.

When his father retired to a monastery in 1238, he ruled the Holstein jointly with his elder brother John I, initially under the guardianship of their brother-in-law the Duke Abel of Schleswig.  When they came of age, the brothers took up government and continue their joint rule.  In 1255, they concluded a trade agreement with Lübeck.

When their father died in 1261, John and Gerhard divided Holstein.  Gerhard took Holstein-Itzehoe, consisting of the districts of Stormarn, Plön and Schaumburg, with his residence in Itzehoe.  John received Holstein-Kiel, consisting of the districts Kiel, Wagria and East Holstein, with his seat in Kiel.  John later won Rendsburg back from Denmark and traded it with Gerhard for Segeberg.

Gerhard founded several villages, in order to develop Holstein and control the area.  He also developed the County's administration.  He fought ward with the Archdiocese of Bremen, the City of Lübeck and the landed gentry in his county.  In 1262, he won the Battle of the Loh Moor.  In 1263, John died and Gerhard became regent of Kiel and Segeberg for John's sons.

Gerhard I died in 1290.  After his death, his sons subdivided Holstein-itzehoe into Holstein-Plön, Holstein-Pinneberg and Holstein-Rendsburg.

Seal 
The inscription on his seal reads: S(IGILLUM)* GERARDI*COMITIS*HOLTSATIE*ET*DE*SCOWENB(O)RCH ("Seal of Count Gerhard of Holstein and Schauenburg").

Marriages and issue 
He married around 1250 with Elizabeth (d. ), a daughter of John I of Mecklenburg and had the following children with her:
 Liutgard, ( – Aft. 1289), married:
 Duke John of Brunswick-Lüneburg
 Prince Albert I of Anhalt-Zerbst
 John (1253 – ), Canon in Hamburg
 Gerhard II (1254–1312), Count of Holstein-Plön
 Adolph VI (1256–1315), Count of Holstein-Pinneberg and Schauenburg
 Henry I (1258–1304), Count of Holstein-Rendsburg
 Elisabeth (d. before 1284), married to Count Burchard of Wolpe
 Albrert (1272–1281)
 Bruno
 Otto
 Matilda, married to Count John of Wunstorf
 Hedwig (before 1264 – ), married to King Magnus III of Sweden
  
Around 1280, he married Adelaide (Alessia;  – 1285), the widow of Albert I, Duke of Brunswick-Lüneburg, and a daughter of Marquess Boniface II of Monferrat ( – 1253). This marriage remained childless.

Ancestors

References

External links

Entry at genealogie-mittelalter.de

|-

|-

People from Steinburg
Counts of Holstein
House of Schauenburg
1232 births
1290 deaths